In mathematics, specifically in symplectic topology and algebraic geometry, a quantum cohomology ring is an extension of the ordinary cohomology ring of a closed symplectic manifold. It comes in two versions, called small and big; in general, the latter is more complicated and contains more information than the former. In each, the choice of coefficient ring (typically a Novikov ring, described below) significantly affects its structure, as well.

While the cup product of ordinary cohomology describes how submanifolds of the manifold intersect each other, the quantum cup product of quantum cohomology describes how subspaces intersect in a "fuzzy", "quantum" way. More precisely, they intersect if they are connected via one or more pseudoholomorphic curves. Gromov–Witten invariants, which count these curves, appear as coefficients in expansions of the quantum cup product.

Because it expresses a structure or pattern for Gromov–Witten invariants, quantum cohomology has important implications for enumerative geometry. It also connects to many ideas in mathematical physics and mirror symmetry. In particular, it is ring-isomorphic to symplectic Floer homology.

Throughout this article, X is a closed symplectic manifold with symplectic form ω.

Novikov ring

Various choices of coefficient ring for the quantum cohomology of X are possible. Usually a ring is chosen that encodes information about the second homology of X. This allows the quantum cup product, defined below, to record information about pseudoholomorphic curves in X. For example, let

be the second homology modulo its torsion. Let R be any commutative ring with unit and Λ the ring of formal power series of the form

where

 the coefficients  come from R,
 for every real number C, only finitely many A with ω(A) less than or equal to C have nonzero coefficients .

The variable  is considered to be of degree , where  is the first Chern class of the tangent bundle TX, regarded as a complex vector bundle by choosing any almost complex structure compatible with ω. Thus Λ is a graded ring, called the Novikov ring for ω. (Alternative definitions are common.)

Small quantum cohomology
Let

be the cohomology of X modulo torsion. Define the small quantum cohomology with coefficients in Λ to be

Its elements are finite sums of the form

The small quantum cohomology is a graded R-module with

The ordinary cohomology H*(X) embeds into QH*(X, Λ) via , and QH*(X, Λ) is generated as a Λ-module by H*(X).

(The right-hand side is a genus-0, 3-point Gromov–Witten invariant.) Then define

This extends by linearity to a well-defined Λ-bilinear map

called the small quantum cup product.

Geometric interpretation
The only pseudoholomorphic curves in class A = 0 are constant maps, whose images are points. It follows that

in other words,

Thus the quantum cup product contains the ordinary cup product; it extends the ordinary cup product to nonzero classes A.

In general, the Poincaré dual of (a∗b)A corresponds to the space of pseudoholomorphic curves of class A passing through the Poincaré duals of a and b. So while the ordinary cohomology considers a and b to intersect only when they meet at one or more points, the quantum cohomology records a nonzero intersection for a and b whenever they are connected by one or more pseudoholomorphic curves. The Novikov ring just provides a bookkeeping system large enough to record this intersection information for all classes A.

Example
Let X be the complex projective plane with its standard symplectic form (corresponding to the Fubini–Study metric) and complex structure. Let  be the Poincaré dual of a line L. Then

The only nonzero Gromov–Witten invariants are those of class A = 0 or A = L. It turns out that

and

where δ is the Kronecker delta. Therefore,

In this case it is convenient to rename  as q and use the simpler coefficient ring Z[q]. This q is of degree . Then

Properties of the small quantum cup product
For a, b of pure degree,

and

The small quantum cup product is distributive and Λ-bilinear. The identity element  is also the identity element for small quantum cohomology.

The small quantum cup product is also associative. This is a consequence of the gluing law for Gromov–Witten invariants, a difficult technical result. It is tantamount to the fact that the Gromov–Witten potential (a generating function for the genus-0 Gromov–Witten invariants) satisfies a certain third-order differential equation known as the WDVV equation.

An intersection pairing

is defined by

(The subscripts 0 indicate the A = 0 coefficient.) This pairing satisfies the associativity property

Dubrovin connection
When the base ring R is C, one can view the evenly graded part H of the vector space QH*(X, Λ) as a complex manifold. The small quantum cup product restricts to a well-defined, commutative product on H. Under mild assumptions, H with the intersection pairing  is then a Frobenius algebra.

The quantum cup product can be viewed as a connection on the tangent bundle TH, called the Dubrovin connection. Commutativity and associativity of the quantum cup product then correspond to zero-torsion and zero-curvature conditions on this connection.

Big quantum cohomology
There exists a neighborhood U of 0 ∈ H such that  and the Dubrovin connection give U the structure of a Frobenius manifold. Any a in U defines a quantum cup product

by the formula

Collectively, these products on H are called the big quantum cohomology. All of the genus-0 Gromov–Witten invariants are recoverable from it; in general, the same is not true of the simpler small quantum cohomology.

Small quantum cohomology has only information of 3-point Gromov–Witten invariants, but the big quantum cohomology has of all (n ≧ 4) n-point Gromov–Witten invariants. To obtain enumerative geometrical information for some manifolds, we need to use big quantum cohomology. Small quantum cohomology would correspond to 3-point correlation functions in physics while big quantum cohomology would correspond to all of n-point correlation functions.

References
 McDuff, Dusa & Salamon, Dietmar (2004). J-Holomorphic Curves and Symplectic Topology, American Mathematical Society colloquium publications. .
 
 Piunikhin, Sergey; Salamon, Dietmar & Schwarz, Matthias (1996). Symplectic Floer–Donaldson theory and quantum cohomology. In C. B. Thomas (Ed.), Contact and Symplectic Geometry, pp. 171–200. Cambridge University Press. 

Algebraic geometry
Cohomology theories
String theory
Symplectic topology